Cogollor is a municipality located in the province of Guadalajara, Castile-La Mancha, Spain. Featuring a total area of 8.32 km, as of 1 January 2019 it has a population of 25 inhabitants. It lies at 950 metres above sea level.

References 

Municipalities in the Province of Guadalajara